Tango Palace is the ninth album by New Orleans singer and pianist Dr. John. It was his second and last album recorded for jazz label Horizon Records.  It also marked the second album on which he collaborated with Doc Pomus on a few songs.

Track listing
"Keep That Music Simple" (Giddon Daniels) – 3:35
"Disco-Therapy" (Alvin Robinson, Mac Rebennack) – 4:14
"Renegade" (Rebennack, Gerry Goffin) – 3:57
Fonky Side (Rebennack, Doc Pomus) – 3:19
"Bon Temps Rouler" (Rebennack, Pomus) – 4:25
"Something You Got" (Chris Kenner, Antoine Domino) – 2:37
"I Thought I Heard New Orleans Say" (Rebennack, Pomus) – 4:26
"Tango Palace" (Rebennack, Pomus) – 4:20
"Louisiana Lullabye" (Rebennack, Pomus) – 4:03

Personnel

Musicians

 Dr. John – keyboards, vocals
 Abraham Laboriel – bass
 Andre Fischer – drums (track 1)
 Herman Ernest – drums (tracks 3, 5–7), percussion (tracks 4, 8–9)
 Steve Gadd – drums (tracks 4, 8–9), percussion (tracks 3, 5–7)
 Hugh McCracken – guitar
 Alvin Robinson – guitar, backing vocal (track 6)

 Fred Staehle – percussion, Wingertree
 Paulinho da Costa – percussion
 Neil Larsen – percussion
 Ronnie Barron – percussion, backing vocals
 Charlie Miller – trumpet, cornet solo (track 7)
 Oscar Brashear – trumpet, flugelhorn
 Warren Luening – trumpet, flugelhorn
 Benny Powell – trombone
 Herman Riley – baritone saxophone

 Plas Johnson – tenor saxophone, flute & clarinet
 Jackie Kelso – tenor saxophone, clarinet
 Gary Herbig – tenor saxophone solo (track 5)
 Tommy Johnson – tuba
 Larry Williams – tenor, alto saxophone, clarinet
 Kim Hutchcroft – tenor, soprano saxophone
 Harold Battiste – horn arrangements
 Petsye Powell, Tami Lynn, Brenda Russell, Jim Gilstrap, Muffy Hendricks, Denise Trammell – backing vocals

Technical

 Tommy LiPuma – producer
 Hugh McCracken – producer
 Al Schmitt – engineer
 Norm Kinney – engineer
 Don Henderson – assistant engineer
 Linda Tyler – assistant engineer

 Mike Reese – mastering
 Roland Young – art direction
 Amy Nagasawa – design
 Lou Beach – cover art
 Mark Hanauer – photography

References

1979 albums
Dr. John albums
Albums produced by Tommy LiPuma
Horizon Records albums
Disco albums by American artists
Funk albums by American artists
Jazz fusion albums by American artists